John Moore (1834–1894) was an Irish piper.

Moore was born in or near the town of Galway about 1834. His father died while he was yet a boy, his mother remarried to Martin O'Reilly, himself a celebrated piper. O'Reilly tutored Moore on the pipes.

At some point, Moore emigrated to the United States, enlisting in the navy, in which he served "for quite a few years." After leaving  the navy, he settled in Brooklyn, working as a professional piper around New York City.

On an 1887 engagement in Springheld, Ohio, organised by Mr. Powers of the Ivy Leaf Company, he became ill and was hospitalised. He was replaced by Barney Delaney.

In 1894, he returned to Galway in order to bring his step-father to New York. The night prior to departure, he visited Patsy Touhey and Patrick FitzPatrick, who noted his condition was not the best but not alarming. However, he died within a week while en route, and was buried at sea on his own request.

O'Neill remarks of him:

Moore was not particularly distinguished for brilliancy of execution on the chanter, but in the manipulation of the regulators he had few if any superiors. Often when the reed in his chanter proved refractory or did not “go” to suit him, he would play the whole tune through on the keys of the regulators.

References

 Famous Pipers who flourished principally in the second half of the nineteenth century Chapter 21 in Irish Minstrels and Musicians, by Capt. Francis O'Neill, 1913.

External links
 http://billhaneman.ie/IMM/IMM-XXI.html

1834 births
1894 deaths
19th-century Irish people
Musicians from County Galway
People from Brooklyn
Irish uilleann pipers
Burials at sea
Irish emigrants to the United States (before 1923)